Maria Chriselle Elisse Joson Diuco (born January 6, 1996), professionally known as Elisse Joson, is a Filipino actress, model, dancer and endorser.

Personal life
Elisse Joson was born in Balanga, Bataan, Philippines. She is the only daughter of an anesthesiologist and single mother, Christine Joson-Diuco, and an estranged father. She attended Bataan Montessori School during her elementary school years.

At a young age of 7, Joson attended various acting and singing workshops where she was deemed to be shy. Joson's family later migrated from the Philippines to the United States and lived there for a few years. She attended Inderkum High School during her high school years in Sacramento, California. While living there, she experienced bullying for not being able to speak English fluently. This experience, however, allowed her to gain confidence in herself. Upon moving back to Manila, she used this newly found confidence and fully pursued her passion for acting. At 16, she then became one of ABS-CBN network's pool of Star Magic artists and she enrolled in Quezon City Science High School finishing with High Honors.

She is currently studying AB Fashion Design and Merchandising at De La Salle-College of Saint Benilde. Her interest for fashion is influenced by the works of Alexander McQueen. Elisse was in a relationship with her screen partner Mccoy de Leon from 2017 to January 2023.  They had a child together named Felize de Leon which they introduced on Pinoy Big Brother: Kumunity Season 10.

Career

Joson began in the local entertainment industry at the age of 16. In 2012, she was the leading lady of singer Jovit Baldivino, in the music video of the latter's song, "Tell Me". In 2013, she became a familiar face as she appeared in various shows and dramas as a supporting actress, such as Cheska in the daytime television series "Be Careful With My Heart". She also starred as Erica in the primetime TV series Sana Bukas pa ang Kahapon starring Bea Alonzo and Paulo Avelino.

In 2014, she starred as one of the 'mean girls' in the teen romantic, comedy-drama film, "She's Dating the Gangster" starring Kathryn Bernardo and Daniel Padilla.

In 2015, she made her first digital movie (Indie film) "Saranghaeyo #Ewankosau" with Barbie Forteza and Francis Magundayao. The film recognized her as one of the nominees for the 'New Movie Actress of the Year' category in the 32nd PMPC Star Awards for Movies.

She then became a part of the teen-oriented show "Luv U" as Divina and the primetime television series "You're My Home" as Alexis Madrigal.

Her biggest break in the entertainment industry was her McDonald's Philippines TV ad in 2016. The fast food chain's campaign, "Tuloy Pa Rin," promoted the concept of welcoming change and moving forward after a heartbreak to ultimately become a stronger and more independent individual. Due to its relatable "hugot" appeal, the ad went viral worldwide. It currently holds almost 2 million views on YouTube. In the same year, Joson became a part of the "lucky" group of housemates in the reality TV series Pinoy Big Brother: Lucky Season 7.

She joined the primetime TV series FPJ's Ang Probinsyano in 2016, where she played the role of Lorraine, the cousin of SPO2 Jerome Gerona Jr. played by John Prats.
Also in 2017 she had a drama serye called (the good son) starring Joshua Garcia, McCoy De Leon, Jerome Ponce and Nash Aguas. In 2018, Elisse became a part of the cast of the primetime teleserye Ngayon at Kailanman; she played Roxanne, Inno's childhood friend, who was later revealed to be the real daughter of Adessa Mapendo named Christina.

Elisse starred in the TV series Sandugo as Grace Policarpio, the love interest of (JC Reyes) Ejay Falcon and (Aristotle "Aris" Reyes/Leo Balthazar) Aljur Abrenica.

Filmography

Television
{| class="wikitable sortable"
! Year || Title || Role || Network || Ref.
|-
| rowspan=2| 2022
| Maalaala Mo Kaya: Pulseras
| Joy
| rowspan="3"| Kapamilya Channel
|
|-
| The Goodbye Girl
| Julia
| rowspan="2" | iWantTFC
|
|-
| rowspan="2" | 2021
| Horroscope
| Clarissa
|
|-
|Love on da Move
|
|TV5
|-
| rowspan="2" | 2020
|Beauty and the Boss
| Stella
|iflix
|
|-
|Ampalaya Chronicles
|
|iWant
|-
| 2019
|  Maalaala Mo Kaya: Hot Choco
| Shareena Paredes-Monzon
| rowspan="22" | ABS-CBN
|-
| 2019–2020
| Sandugo
| Grace Policarpio
|
|-
| 2019
|  Maalaala Mo Kaya: Painting
| Ancel
|
|-
| 2018–2019
| Ngayon at Kailanman
| Roxanne Constantino / Christina Mapendo
| 
|-
| rowspan="3" | 2018
| Maalaala Mo Kaya: Skateboard
| Margielyn Didal
| 
|-
| Ipaglaban Mo: Ganti 
| Aliana Flores
|
|-
| Wansapanataym: Ofishially Yours
| Stella Ortiz
|
|-
| 2017–2018
| The Good Son
| Sabina De Guzman
|
|-
| 2017
| Pinoy Big Brother Presents Titig ng Pag-Ibig
| Kim
|
|-
| 2016–2017
| FPJ's Ang Probinsyano
| Lorraine Pedrosa-Girona
|
|-
| 2016–present
| ASAP
| Herself / Performer
|
|-
| 2016–2017
| Pinoy Big Brother: Lucky 7
| Herself
|
|-
| rowspan="6" |2015
| You're My Home
| Alexis Madrigal
|
|-
| Wansapanataym: Fat Patty
| Brenda
| 
|-
| Ipaglaban Mo: Tinalikurang Pangako
| Pam
| 
|-
| Maalaala Mo Kaya: Bintana
| Prima's Friend
| 
|-
| Maalaala Mo Kaya: Eye Glasses
| Jenny
| 
|-
| Luv U
| Divina
|
|-
| rowspan="3" |2014
| Sana Bukas pa ang Kahapon
| Erica
|
|-
| Forevermore
| Wedding Guest
|
|-
| Wansapanataym: My App #Boyfie
| Shannon
|
|-
| 2014
| Maalaala Mo Kaya: Cellphone
| Donna's Friend
| 
|-
| rowspan="3" |2013
| Maynila: Love Thy Neighbor
| Joy
| GMA Network
|
|-
| Kahit Konting Pagtingin
| Party Guest
| rowspan="5" |ABS-CBN
|
|-
| Maalaala Mo Kaya: Gown
| Joan
| 
|-
| 2013–2014
| Be Careful With My Heart
| Cheska
|
|-
| rowspan="2" |2012
| Maalaala Mo Kaya: Cards
| Ruby
| 
|-
| Wansapanataym: The Fairy Garden
| Lambana
|

Film

Awards and nominations

References

Filipino child actresses
Filipino film actresses
Filipino television actresses
Filipino female models
Star Magic
1996 births
Actresses from Manila
ABS-CBN personalities
Pinoy Big Brother contestants
Living people